Anja Tepeš (born 27 February 1991) is a retired Slovenian ski jumper. She made her World Cup debut on 3 December 2011 in Lillehammer, Norway. Anja is the daughter of Miran Tepeš and the sister of Jurij Tepeš, who are both former ski jumpers.

References

1991 births
Living people
Slovenian female ski jumpers
Skiers from Ljubljana
21st-century Slovenian women